Singles & Sessions 1979–1981 is a compilation of previously hard-to-find or unreleased material from Leeds post-punk band Delta 5. It contains the 3 Rough Trade singles "Mind Your Own Business", "Anticipation" and "Try" with their B-sides, 7 Peel and other BBC Radio sessions, and 3 live cuts. Later releases include 3 additional remixes of "Mind Your Own Business" produced in 2009.

Track listing
All tracks composed by Delta 5

Tracks 1 and 2 from Rough Trade single RT 031, September 1979, recorded at The Workhouse, London, produced by Delta 5 and Rob Warr
Tracks 3 and 4 from Rough Trade single RT 041, February 1980, recorded at Foel Studios, Wales, produced by Delta 5
Tracks 5 and 6 from Rough Trade single RT 061, September 1980, recorded at The Point, London, produced by Delta 5 and Phil Brown
Tracks 7 and 8 from BBC John Peel session February 4, 1980
Track 9 from BBC John Peel session September 2, 1980
Tracks 10-13 from BBC Richard Skinner session July 16, 1981
Tracks 14-16 live at Berkeley Square, Berkeley, California on September 27, 1980, produced, recorded and mixed by Terry Hammer

Personnel
Delta 5
Julz Sale - vocals
Alan Riggs - guitar
Bethan Peters - bass, vocals
Ros Allen - bass, vocals
Kelvin Knight - drums
with:
Andrew Marson, Chris Kane, Jeff Evans - horns on "Try" and "Colour"

References 

Delta 5 albums
2006 compilation albums
Kill Rock Stars compilation albums